Simplicia rectalis is a species of moth belonging to the family Erebidae.

It is native to Europe and Russian Far East.

References

Erebidae
Moths described in 1842